= Augusta Svendsen =

Icelandic merchant

Augusta Svendsen (1835 – 1924) was an Icelandic merchant. She is known as the first female merchant in the Icelandic capital.

She was born on Iceland to the Icelandic priest Snorri Sæmundsson and Kristín Gunnarsdóttir. She married the Danish shop owner Hendrik Henckel Svendsen. In 1886, she returned as a widow to Iceland from Denmark (having lived there since 1862), and opened a shop in Reykjavík. The settlement was at that point just recently on its way to become an actual town, and she was the first woman to be registered among the first shop owners there.
